= Iron shot =

Iron shot may refer to:

- Small round iron balls used as projectiles.
- Simple weights used with balance scales.
- Iron balls used in the sporting event shot put.
